The Yellow Creek massacre was a killing of several Mingo Indians by Virginian settlers on April 30, 1774. The massacre occurred across from the mouth of the Yellow Creek on the upper Ohio River in the Ohio Country, near the current site of the Mountaineer Casino, Racetrack and Resort. It was the single most important incident contributing to the outbreak of Lord Dunmore's War (May-October 1774). It was carried out by a group led by Jacob Greathouse and Daniel Greathouse. The perpetrators were never brought to justice. 

The ramifications of the massacre proved more severe because Mingo leader Logan maintained friendly relationships with Virginian settlers in the region.  Chief Logan was away on a hunt but his wife Mellana, his brother Taylaynee (called John Petty by the Virginian settlers), Taylaynee's son Molnah and their sister Koonay were among those killed in the massacre. Koonay was also the wife of John Gibson, a prominent American trader operating between the Virginian settlers and various Native American groups. At the time of the massacre, these groups were on a trading expedition to the Shawnee.  

The Greathouse group lured the Mingo group under Taylaynee into their camp with a promise of liquor and a chance to play some sport. They then sprung an ambush on the Mingos and massacred them with musket fire. After the killings many of the bodies were mutilated. In a particularly brutal killing, Jacob Greathouse ripped open Koonay's abdomen and removed and scalped her unborn son. The only member of the first group who was not killed was Koonay's two-year-old daughter who was eventually returned to the care of her father, John Gibson, after she had for a time been in the care of William Crawford.

Daniel Greathouse died of measles in 1775. Jacob Greathouse was killed in the ambush of William Foreman Company in September 1777. It was Jonathan Greathouse who was killed 1791 while moving his family west. They were abducted by Native Americans on the Ohio River.

References

A Man of Distinction Among Them, Alexander McKee and the Ohio Country Frontier" by Larry L. Nelson, pp. 78-81
Letters From Yellow Creek 1774
Alexander Withers, Chronicles of Border Warfare pp 148-150
The History of Yellow Creek, Lawrence J. Fleenor Jr, Daniel Boone Wilderness Trail, Feb. 2004, retrieved 25 March 2014.

Conflicts in 1774
Pre-statehood history of Ohio
Native American history of Ohio
Massacres of Native Americans
1774 in Virginia
Massacres in the Thirteen Colonies
Massacres in 1774
1774 murders in North America